The 1935 Texas College Steers football team was an American football team that represented Texas College as a member of the Southwestern Athletic Conference (SWAC) during the 1935 college football season. In their fifth and final season under head coach Ace Mumford, the team compiled a 9–0–1 record, won the SWAC championship, and outscored all opponents by a total of 341 to 19. College Football Data Warehouse also reports that the team played Shorter College to a 0–0 tie at some point during the season. 

Following its victory over Alabama State, the Texas College team was recognized as the 1935 black college national champion.

Key players included quarterback "Paps" Walker, fullback Myles Anderson, and halfback Edwin Turner. Walker was selected as the team's most valuable player.

The 1935 team compiled the program's second consecutive undefeated season under Mumford. Having never won more than four games in a season prior to 1934, Mumford's 1934 and 1935 teams compiled a combined record of 18–0–3.  Mumford left the Texas College program after the 1935–36 academic year to assume coaching duties at Southern University. He first came to the attention of Southern officials after his Texas College team soundly defeated the Jaguars; afterward, when a Southern dean accused his Texas College players of stealing from the school, Mumford forced all of his players to get off of the team bus and to display their personal belongings until the school's missing items could be located. Southern officials were impressed by both his coaching and disciplinary actions of that day.

Schedule

References

Texas College
Texas College Steers football seasons
Black college football national champions
College football undefeated seasons
Texas College Steers football